Tristan Gebbia (born June 1, 1998) is an American football quarterback for the Ohio State Buckeyes. He is currently a seventh-year senior.

College career
Gebbia began his collegiate career at Nebraska in 2017 before transferring to Oregon State.

Gebbia was Oregon State's starting quarterback for four games in 2020 before sustaining a hamstring injury on a quarterback sneak against Oregon.  

Gebbia did not play in 2021 but returned in 2022 and was voted a team captain for the third consecutive year. Limited to a backup role, he completed five of five passes in 2022. He transferred to Ohio State on January 17, 2023.

References

External links
 Oregon State Beavers bio

1998 births
Living people
American football quarterbacks
Oregon State Beavers football players
People from Calabasas, California
Players of American football from California
Sportspeople from Los Angeles County, California